Egil Åsman (July 20, 1928 – February 3, 1984) was a Norwegian actor and dancer.

In the 1950s he was engaged with the New Theater, the Norwegian Theater, the Edderkoppen Theater, the National Theater, and the People's Theater. From the 1960s to the 1980s, Åsman was primarily engaged with the Oslo New Theater. He also performed in a few film roles, as well as in NRK's Television Theater during its debut in 1954 in Olav Engebretsen's I moralens navn.

Filmography
 1954: I moralens navn as Fredrik
 1959: 5 loddrett as a rock singer
 1960: Millionær for en aften as a dancer
 1965: Det angår ikke oss (TV)
 1965: Equilibrium – Det er meg du skal elske as Roger
 1969: 22. november - den store leiegården (TV) as a hairdresser
 1969: I dag død, i morgen rosenrød (TV)

References

External links
 
 Egil Åsman at Sceneweb
 Egil Åsman at Filmfront
 Egil Åsman at the National Theater

1928 births
1984 deaths
20th-century Norwegian male actors
Norwegian male dancers